John I ( 1268 - 20 May 1285) was King of Cyprus and, in contention with Charles I of Anjou, of Jerusalem too from 1284 to 1285.

John was the eldest surviving son of Hugh III, king of Cyprus and Jerusalem, and Isabella of Ibelin. Hugh died on 3 March 1284 and John was crowned the next king of Cyprus in Nicosia on 11 May. He was then aged about 17, and was handsome and delicate. Immediately afterwards, he sailed to Tyre, where he was crowned king of Jerusalem. On the mainland, he was recognized as king only in Tyre and Beirut, which were ruled by his aunt Margaret and brother Guy, respectively. Acre, political centre of the Kingdom of Jerusalem, recognized Charles. John died on 20 May 1285, almost exactly a year after his coronation, leaving the crown to his younger brother Henry II.

References

Sources

 

1259 births
1285 deaths
13th-century kings of Jerusalem
13th-century Cypriot people
Kings of Cyprus
Kings of Jerusalem
House of Poitiers-Lusignan